Bikmurzino (Bikmırźa) is a rural locality (a village) in Baygildinsky Selsoviet, Nurimanovsky District, Bashkortostan, Russia. The population was 150 as of 2010. There are 6 streets.

Geography 
Bikmurzino is located 33 km southwest of Krasnaya Gorka (the district's administrative centre) by road. Kargino is the nearest rural locality.

References 

Rural localities in Nurimanovsky District